Rhizomnium pseudopunctatum is a species of moss belonging to the family Mniaceae.

It is native to Northern Hemisphere.

References

Mniaceae